Eugène Berman (4 November 1899, Saint Petersburg, Russia – 14 December 1972, Rome) and his brother Leonid Berman (1896 – 1976) were Russian Neo-romantic painters and theater and opera designers.

Early years
Born in Russia, the Bermans fled the Russian revolution in 1918.  In Paris the Bermans exhibited at the Galerie Pierre where their work earned them the name "Neo-Romantics" for its melancholy and introspective qualities, having taken inspiration from the Blue Period paintings of Pablo Picasso.  Other Neo-Romantic painters were Christian Bérard, Pavel Tchelitchev, Kristians Tonny and, later in America, their friend Muriel Streeter (wife of their art dealer Julien Levy).

Eugène's work was characterized by lonely landscapes featuring sculptural and architectural elements, often ruins, rendered in a neo-classical manner, whereas that of Leonid depicted beaches with fisherman's boats and nets in many parts of the world.  In 1935 Eugène left for New York where he exhibited frequently at the Julien Levy Gallery (as did Leonid after the war). Later, in the 1940s, Eugène settled in Los Angeles and married the actress Ona Munson, while Leonid remained in New York and married the harpsichordist Sylvia Marlowe. In 1950 he exhibited at Instituto de Arte Moderno, Buenos Aires. In 1950, Berman was elected into the National Academy of Design as an Associate member, and became a full member in 1954.

Later years and death
In America, Eugène became well known as a stage designer for ballet and opera.  Following the suicide of his wife in 1955, he moved to Rome where Princess Doria-Pamphilj provided an apartment and studio for him in a wing of her palazzo on the via del Corso. In 1957 he was working with Sylvia Guirey on a new production for the Metropolitan Opera of Don Giovanni. Berman continued to paint in Italy until his death in 1972. Leonid died in New York in 1976.

Works 
 Ballet Imperial by George Balanchine, Sadler's Wells Ballet, London (1950).

Legacy
Eugene Berman's work can be found in a number of institutions, including: 
 McNay Art Museum
Museum of Modern Art
Art Institute of Chicago
Hirshhorn Museum and Sculpture Garden

See also 
 Christian Bérard

References

External links
 W.H. Crain Costume and Scene Design Collection at the Harry Ransom Center

Russian painters
Russian male painters
20th-century American painters
American male painters
Jewish painters
American people of Russian-Jewish descent
Russian designers
Sibling artists
Emigrants from the Russian Empire to the United States
Emigrants from the Russian Empire to France
Emigrants from the Russian Empire to Italy
Sibling duos
20th-century American male artists